Dixie Garage, also known as the Nash Garage, is a historic automobile repair shop located at West Baden Springs, Orange County, Indiana.  It was built between 1918 and 1920, and is a large one-story, brick building with a barrel vaulted roof.  It is square in plan and features curved parapets and corner piers.  Inside the building is a two-story, concrete block structure.  The building housed an automobile repair shop until the late 1930s, after which it housed a skating rink, bottling plant, and wood manufacturer.

It was listed on the National Register of Historic Places in 2001.

References 

Commercial buildings on the National Register of Historic Places in Indiana
Commercial buildings completed in 1920
Buildings and structures in Orange County, Indiana
National Register of Historic Places in Orange County, Indiana
Transportation buildings and structures in Orange County, Indiana